This is the discography of American hip hop group Travis Porter.

Albums

Studio albums

Extended plays

Mixtapes

Singles

Other charted songs

Guest appearances

References

Discographies of American artists

de:Travis Porter
fr:Travis Porter